José María Sánchez-Silva y García-Morales (11 November 1911 – 13 January 2002) was a Spanish writer. He received the Hans Christian Andersen Medal in 1968 for his contribution to children's literature. He is best known for his novel Marcelino Bread and Wine (1953) which was filmed in 1955, as Miracle of Marcelino.

Early life
Sánchez-Silva was born in Madrid. His father, also José María Sánchez Silva, was a journalist close to anarchism, writing in the journal Earth, who went into exile in 1939. The family had been unstructured and the son (Sánchez-Silva) at times was practically a vagrant child. He joined institutions for orphans and children at risk such as Del Pardo School of Madrid (dependent on the City Council of Madrid). In these institutions he learned typing and shorthand, which earned him a stenographer's position in Madrid.

Career 
In 1934, he published his first book The Man in the Scarf.

During the Spanish Civil War, he remained in the Republican zone in Madrid, working with the Falange until Nationalist troops entered the city. In 1939, he began working as a journalist in the newspaper Arriba. He became assistant principal of the paper and collaborated with the newspaper El Pueblo.

Sánchez-Silva won fame as a result of Marcelino Bread and Wine (Marcelino, pan y vino, 1953), which was made into a film by Ladislao Vajda as Miracle of Marcelino, and became one of the great successes of Spanish cinema worldwide. It was further adapted into Marcelino (anime).

After the success of Marcelino, he returned to the character in stories Marcelino Pan y Vino and Adventures in the sky Marcelino Pan y Vino.

Together with José Luis Sáenz de Heredia, he was the author of the screenplay of the movie Franco, ese hombre, a biography in the caudillo.

Awards
The biennial Hans Christian Andersen Award conferred by the International Board on Books for Young People is the highest recognition available to a writer or illustrator of children's books. Sánchez-Silva received the writing award in 1966.

He won the Spanish prize for literature in 1957.

References

1911 births
2002 deaths
Spanish children's writers
 
Hans Christian Andersen Award for Writing winners
Place of death missing
20th-century Spanish journalists